Mbandaka Airport  is an airport serving the Congo River port of Mbandaka, capital city of the Équateur District in the Democratic Republic of the Congo. The runway is on the southeast side of the city.

Facilities 

Airlines and destinations

See also

Transport in the Democratic Republic of the Congo
List of airports in the Democratic Republic of the Congo

References

External links
 Mbandaka Airport at OpenStreetMap
 
 

Airports in the Province of Équateur
Mbandaka